
This club should not be confused with the La MaMa Experimental Theatre Club of New York.
The Experimental Theatre Club (ETC) is a student dramatic society at the University of Oxford, England. It was founded in 1936 by Nevill Coghill as an alternative company to the Oxford University Dramatic Society (OUDS), and produces several productions a year.

The club has staged the first productions of many new works, including Epitaph for George Dillon, written by John Osborne in 1957 and directed by Don Taylor.

Etceteras
ETC was home to Oxford's student revue company, the Etceteras – by the early 1970s a rather poor relation of the Cambridge Footlights. Then, in 1975, two figures who would together become major players in TV and film comedy met after answering an advert to join the Etceteras revue-writing team. They were Richard Curtis and Rowan Atkinson – a graduate engineering student who made his memorable Oxford debut in a Leapyear Revue at the Oxford Playhouse on 29 February 1976, directed by Etceteras president, Robert Orchard. Curtis had already taken his own first bow in another show by the same director, "Allswellthatendsrock!". From 1977 to 1981, Paul Twivy and Ian Hislop then took over the Etceteras, producing several shows at the Edinburgh Festival and Oxford Playhouse.

ETC funded the Etceteras' first major revue in years, "After Eights" at the Oxford Playhouse in May 1976, featuring Atkinson, Curtis, Robin Seavill and others, with material written by the cast, director Andrew Rissik, John Albery, Orchard, Iain Moss and other contributors.

(Note: The Etceteras' brief as part of ETC was to stage regular revues in Oxford, while the show performed at the annual Edinburgh Festival Fringe as the Oxford Revue was produced and funded by the separate Oxford Theatre Group (OTG), which also took several plays to the Fringe. Today's thriving Oxford Revue company combines both roles.)

Alumni
People who have contributed to ETC productions include:

John Albery
Rowan Atkinson
Lindsay Anderson
Alan Bennett
Richard Curtis
Michael Flanders
Piers Fletcher
Philip Franks
Howard Goodall
Tom Hooper
Ian Hislop
Terry Jones
Ken Loach (President)
David Marks
John McGrath (playwright)
Dudley Moore<ref>Obituary: Dudley Moore, 1935–2002, The Daily Telegraph'''', London. 28 March 2002.</ref>
Robert Orchard
Michael Palin
Diana Quick
Tony Richardson
Andrew Rissik
John Schlesinger (President)
Don Taylor
Jeremy Treglown 
Kenneth Tynan (President)
Samuel West (President)
Sandy Wilson
David Wood

Visiting directors include Peter Hall and
Terry Hands.

See also
 The Oxford Revue
 Oxford University Dramatic Society (OUDS)

References

Bibliography
 Glynne Wickham, A Revolution in Attitudes to the Dramatic Arts in British Universities, 1880–1980. Oxford Review of Education, Vol. 3, No. 2 (1977), pp. 115–121 JSTOR
 Roderick Robertson, University Theatre at Oxford. Educational Theatre Journal'', Vol. 8, No. 3 (October 1956), pp. 194–206 JSTOR

External links
 Experimental Theatre Club website

1936 establishments in England
Arts organizations established in 1936
Student theatre in the United Kingdom
Clubs and societies of the University of Oxford
Theatre in Oxford